The 125th New York State Legislature, consisting of the New York State Senate and the New York State Assembly, met from January 1 to March 27, 1902, during the second year of Benjamin B. Odell, Jr.'s governorship, in Albany.

Background
Under the provisions of the New York Constitution of 1894, 50 Senators and 150 assemblymen were elected in single-seat districts; senators for a two-year term, assemblymen for a one-year term. The senatorial districts were made up of entire counties, except New York County (twelve districts), Kings County (seven districts), Erie County (three districts) and Monroe County (two districts). The Assembly districts were made up of contiguous area, all within the same county.

At this time there were two major political parties: the Republican Party and the Democratic Party.

Elections
The New York state election, 1901, was held on November 5. No statewide elective offices were up for election.

Sessions
The Legislature met for the regular session at the State Capitol in Albany on January 1, 1902; and adjourned on March 27.

S. Frederick Nixon (R) was re-elected Speaker.

State Senate

Districts

Note: In 1897, New York County (the boroughs of Manhattan and Bronx), Kings County (the borough of Brooklyn), Richmond County (the borough of Staten Island) and the Western part of Queens County (the borough of Queens) were consolidated into the present-day City of New York. The Eastern part of Queens County (the non-consolidated part) was separated in 1899 as Nassau County. Parts of the 1st and 2nd Assembly districts of Westchester County were annexed by New York City in 1895, and became part of the Borough of the Bronx in 1898.

Members
The asterisk (*) denotes members of the previous Legislature who continued in office as members of this Legislature. Merton E. Lewis changed from the Assembly to the Senate.

Note: For brevity, the chairmanships omit the words "...the Committee on (the)..."

Employees
 Clerk: James S. Whipple
 Sergeant-at-Arms: Charles R. Hotaling
 Assistant Sergeant-at-Arms: William W. Adams
 Doorkeeper: John E. Gorss
 First Assistant Doorkeeper: R. C. Duell
 Stenographer: A. B. Sackett
 Assistant Clerk: Lafayette B. Gleason
 Journal Clerk: Ernest A. Fay
 Index Clerk: A. Miner Wellman
 Clerk of the Finance Committee: Girvease A. Matteson

State Assembly

Assemblymen

Note: For brevity, the chairmanships omit the words "...the Committee on (the)..."

Employees
 Clerk: Archie E. Baxter
 Sergeant-at-Arms: Frank J. Johnston
 Doorkeeper: Jacob Kemple
 First Assistant Doorkeeper: Andrew Kehn
 Second Assistant Doorkeeper: Charles C. Gray
 Stenographer: Henry C. Lammert
 Assistant Clerk: Ray B. Smith
 Chief of the Engrossing Department: Charles H. Betts

Notes

Sources
 The New York Red Book by Edgar L. Murlin (J. B. Lyon Co., Albany NY; 1902; see pg. 55–96 for senators' bios; between pg. 80 and 81 for senators' portraits; pg. 97–182 for assemblymen's bios; between pg. 112 and 113 for assemblymen's portraits; pg. 546 for senators; pg. 570ff for senate and assemblymen's committees; and pg. 575–578 for assemblymen)
 Official New York from Cleveland to Hughes by Charles Elliott Fitch (Hurd Publishing Co., New York and Buffalo, 1911, Vol. IV; see pg. 345f for assemblymen; and 364 for senators)
 Laws of the State of New York (125th Session) (1902)
 REPUBLICAN INCREASE IN THE ASSEMBLY; ...Republicans Elect ... Senators in the Thirtieth and Forty-third Districts to Fill Vacancies in NYT on November 6, 1901
 ASSEMBLYMEN ELECTED in NYT on November 6, 1901
 LEGISLATIVE CAUCUSES ARE HELD AT ALBANY in NYT on January 1, 1902
 OPENING DAY OF THE STATE LEGISLATURE in NYT on January 2, 1902

125
1902 in New York (state)
1902 U.S. legislative sessions